Worcester Plaza (formerly known as Worcester County National Bank Tower) is a building located in downtown Worcester, Massachusetts at 446 Main Street. Designed by Kevin Roche John Dinkeloo and Associates, it was completed in 1974, and is currently tied with The 6Hundred as the tallest building in Worcester. Its façade is completely glass, similar to the  John Hancock Tower in nearby Boston.

The current building was built instead of a larger, more iconic design announced in 1969 that was never realized.

The building was most recently sold in October 2019 to Boston-based Synergy Investments for $16.5 million. It previously sold for $21.5 million in 2000.

Photo gallery

References

External links
 Emporis Page on building

Roche-Dinkeloo buildings
Skyscrapers in Worcester, Massachusetts
Skyscraper office buildings in Massachusetts

Office buildings completed in 1974